Robin Tim Becker (born 18 January 1997) is a German professional footballer who plays as a right-back for  club Dynamo Dresden.

Career
Becker spent the 2016–17 season at 1. FC Heidenheim on loan from Bayer Leverkusen making seven appearances in the 2.  Bundesliga.

In June 2017, he joined Eintracht Braunschweig, also of the 2. Bundesliga, signing a three-year contract.

He was released by Eintracht Braunschweig at the end of the 2019–20 season.

He signed for Dynamo Dresden on a two-year contract in July 2020.

References

External links
 
 

Living people
1997 births
People from Solingen
Sportspeople from Düsseldorf (region)
German footballers
Footballers from North Rhine-Westphalia
Association football defenders
Germany youth international footballers
2. Bundesliga players
3. Liga players
Regionalliga players
Bayer 04 Leverkusen players
1. FC Heidenheim players
Eintracht Braunschweig players
Dynamo Dresden players